The Garrett Building is a historic office building located at 233-239 Redwood Street, Baltimore, Maryland, United States. It is a 13-story, limestone faced skyscraper which combines the Commercial style with Renaissance Revival detailing. It was designed and built in 1913 by the Baltimore architects J.B. Noel Wyatt and William G. Nolting for the Garrett and Sons investment banking company, a leading Baltimore financial institution offering a wide variety of services in several cities.

History 
Robert Garrett was an Irish immigrant and merchant who came to Baltimore in 1801 and  opened his financial firm in 1819. His son, John W. Garrett, was an American banker, philanthropist, and president of the Baltimore and Ohio Railroad (B&O), whose support for the Union was critical in the Civil War. He was a close confidante of Johns Hopkins and George Peabody. Robert Garrett's great-grandson, Robert Garrett was an Olympic athlete and prominent in Baltimore civic life in the 20th century.  Robert Garrett & Sons resided there until 1974 when it merged with Alex. Brown & Sons.

The Baltimore law firm Gordon Feinblatt which had leased space in The Garrett Building since 1967, purchased the building in 1981 and then began one of the largest single restoration projects in the history of downtown Baltimore. The project was completed in January, 1984. Since that time, The Garrett Building has been the home of Gordon Feinblatt.

The Garrett Building was listed on the National Register of Historic Places in 1982.

References

External links
, including photo from 1983, at Maryland Historical Trust
Robert Garrett and Sons records at the University of Maryland Libraries

Downtown Baltimore
Skyscraper office buildings in Baltimore
Commercial buildings on the National Register of Historic Places in Baltimore
Office buildings completed in 1913
Buildings designated early commercial in the National Register of Historic Places
1913 establishments in Maryland